Raymond Watts (also known by his former stage names Nainz, Nainz Watts and Ray Scaballero) is an English musician, the founding and sole member of the industrial music project PIG, sometimes written as <PIG>.

Watts was an early member and periodic collaborator of KMFDM, and has been a visible part of the industrial music scene since the early 1980s. He has toured with KMFDM, Nine Inch Nails, Schaft, Schwein, and Einstürzende Neubauten.

History

Recent activity (2010–present) 
Watts, Dr. Shinto and John Gosling released a four-song EP titled Mellan Rummen on 15 November 2010 on Amazon.com.

On 8 June 2012, Marc Heal revealed a demo version of "the first new PIG track in eight years" titled "Drugzilla (Rough As A Hog's Arse Mix)" via Cubanate's Official Facebook page and providing their followers a link to his personal SoundCloud page. The link was reposted by Watts a few hours later. A second demo titled "Shake" was released on 15 July 2012; again via Heal's Soundcloud page, this time also noting Dan Abela as engineer. In November 2014, Watts approved mixes for an upcoming joint-release EP.

In March 2015, another collaborative EP was announced with Primitive Race titled Long in the Tooth with a worldwide release date of 5 June 2015 through Metropolis Records. Later that month in an interview, Watts revealed a new PIG album has been written and recorded. Former KMFDM bandmate En Esch will be providing final touches to the album.

On 15 June 2016, the official PIG Facebook page announced that the new PIG album titled The Gospel would be released on 9 September 2016 on Metropolis. Soon after. tour dates were announced The American Excess tour with opening bands En Esch & Peter Turns Pirate.  The North American tour takes place in September and October 2016. A remix album, Swine & Punishment, was released in 2017.

In 2018, PIG released the album Risen, supported by another North American tour. 2019 saw the release of a collection of cover songs on an LP titled Candy. The release of Candy was followed in the fall of the same year by the Divine Descent North American Tour, supported by Cyanotic and A Primitive Evolution. The Divine Descent Tour concluded on 6 October 2019 in Minneapolis, Minnesota. A brief tour of the United Kingdom followed.

In 2020, PIG released a compilation album, Pain Is God, which featured some new tracks and included songs from prior tour EPs dating back to the previous year. The album was released digitally, and on CD and vinyl, including special edition packages with unique 3D features in the digipack or record sleeve.

Musical style
PIG tends to sound more orchestral than KMFDM, with darker, more complex, more ambient beats.  His album and song titles tend to be witty, rife with alliteration ("Prayer Praise & Profit") or are plays on the titles of popular works or phrases (The Swining / "Symphony for the Devil"). He also manages to work food, heroin or pork related terms into his albums. Like KMFDM, humor features prominently in PIG's lyrics, although they tend towards a darker/grittier tone than KMFDM's.

Collaboration with KMFDM
Because Raymond Watts is a central figure in both PIG and KMFDM, the two projects have seen much crossover.  Watts has contributed his skills as a songwriter and vocalist to several KMFDM albums, including their first album Opium in 1984, and has a heavy presence on their 1995 album Nihil, which spawned the hit "Juke Joint Jezebel". A collaborative EP titled Sin Sex & Salvation was released in 1994 under the moniker "PIG vs. KMFDM". KMFDM has in turn assisted Watts with his PIG projects in production and personnel.  Current KMFDM guitarists Steve White and Jules Hodgson (as well as former KMFDM guitarist Günter Schulz)
and drummer Andy Selway have been involved with PIG.  Watts has performed with KMFDM as part of the touring lineup, with the concerts billed as "KMFDM featuring PIG". The setlists for those shows feature KMFDM songs alongside Pig songs. A live CD from the 2002 "Sturm & Drang" tour was released on Metropolis Records that same year.

Watts was given a tongue-in-cheek description in the lyrics to the KMFDM song "Intro" from the 2003 album WWIII:

Other collaborations
Watts has worked with several industrial and avant-garde artists, receiving credits as PIG and Raymond Watts interchangeably.  He has also been credited as "Nainz Watts" or "Nains Watts" on several early releases.

From 1984 to 1986 Watts was sound engineer for Mona Mur.
From 1985 to 1989 Watts was a sound engineer for Einstürzende Neubauten.
Watts has occasionally collaborated with J. G. Thirlwell, briefly playing bass in Foetus Corruptus and co-writing songs for Steroid Maximus on the album Gondwanaland.  Thirlwell, in turn, has cowritten and remixed songs for PIG.
Watts recorded music for ex-girlfriend spoken-word artist Sow (born Anna Wildsmith)'s 1994 album Je M'Aime and again for her 1998 album Sick and 2010 album Dog.  "Je M'aime" was reissued under the name "Pig/Sow" in 1999.
PIG's 1995 album Sinsation was released in the US on Trent Reznor's label Nothing Records.  PIG also toured with Reznor's band Nine Inch Nails in the UK.
Japanese-based band Schaft employed Watts as a lyricist/vocalist for the 1994 album Switchblade and companion remix collection Switch.
In 2001, Watts and KMFDM frontman Sascha Konietzko teamed up with Japanese musicians Sakurai Atsushi and Imai Hisashi (also of Schaft and Buck-Tick) to form the project super group Schwein. Schwein released two albums Schweinstein and Son of Schweinstein ; the latter being remixes from the first.
Watts has also provided production, mixing, remixing, and/or vocals for Psychic TV, Chemlab, Haloblack, 2-Kut, Hoodlum Priest, Steroid Maximus, H3llb3nt, The Hit Parade, Brain Drive, Buck-Tick, D.I.E., Sakurai Atsushi, Sprung Aus Den Wolken, The Megaton Men, Mortiis, Judda], Tweaker, Prong, West End and Zos Kia.
Watts contributed an original composition to the soundtrack of the computer game MDK2. It plays on the title screen and one of Max's levels.
Watts has composed music for several Alexander McQueen fashion shows.
Watts has contributed vocals to the track "Second Coming" by Team Cybergeist
In 2020 Watts became a member of industrial supergroup The Joy Thieves by contributing vocals to "Empty Spaces", a song the band recorded for Riveting Music's Tear Down the Walls: A Riveting Tribute to Pink Floyd's The Wall.

Solo band members

Current members
Raymond Watts – vocals, keyboards, programming, guitars (1987–present)
En Esch – vocals, guitars, programming (2016–present)
Steve White – guitars, programming (1993–2007, 2018–present)
Galen Waling – drums (2016–2018, 2019–present)

Former members 
Steve Crittel – live guitars (1991–1992)
Jim McKenchnie – live keyboards (1991–1992)
Kevin Bass – live drums (1991–1992)
Michael Watts – keyboards, organ, vocals (1991–1993, 1998–2006, 2016–2019)
Karl Hyde – guitars (1993–1994)
Santos De Castro – drums (1993, 1994, 1996)
Imai Hisashi – guitars, noises (1994–1998)
Olivier Grasset – drums, percussion, programming, production (1994, 2002, 2010)
Joanna Peacock – bass (1994)
Günter Schulz – guitars, programming (1994–1999, 2006, 2016–2017, 2019–2020)
Jules Hodgson – guitars, bass, keyboards (1997–2006)
Andy Selway – drums (1997–2006)
Jason Knotek – live guitars (2006)
Angel Bartolotta – live drums (2006)
Mark Gemini Thwaite – guitars, bass, synthesizers, programming (2015–2017)
Gregory "Z. Marr" Steward – guitars, keyboards, programming, production (2016–2018)
Eric Gottesman – live keyboards (2016–2017)
Luke Dangler – live guitars (2017)
Ben Christo – guitars (2018–2019)
Martin Eden – guitars, bass, keyboards, programming, production, mixing (2004–2010, 2016–2019)
Jan-Vincent Velazco – drums (2018–2019)

Guest members 
Alex Hacke – guitars (1988)
Nikkolai Weidemann – guitars, piano, saxophone (1988)
Axel Dill – drums, piano, mixing (1988)
Achim Mennicken – guitars (1988–1989; died 2014)
Uwe Wüst – guitars (1988)
Remo Park – guitars (1988)
Christian Graupner – percussion, programming (1988–1989)
J.G. Thirlwell – production (1988–1992)
John Caffery – production, recording (1989–1991)
Roli Mosimann – mixing (1989)
Martin Hawkes – recording, mixing (1991)
Paul Kendall – mixing (1991)
Siewert Johannsen – engineering (1992)
Anna Wildsmith – vocals (1989–1992, 1995–1996, 1998–1999, 2003–2006, 2010; died 2016)
John Gosling – programming, engineering, mixing (1993, 2010, 2018)
Enrico Thomaso – flugelhorn (1993–1994)
Sascha Konietzko – vocals, synthesizers, production, engineering, mixing, programming (1994, 1997, 1998, 2020)
Jennifer Ginsberg – vocals (1994)
Julian Beeston – programming, mixing (1995–1997)
Carol Anne Reynolds – vocals (1995, 1997–1999)
Sakurai Atsushi – vocals (1997–1998)
Chris Shepard – (1997–1998)
Giles Littlefield – production, noises, programming (1996–1997)
Rob Henry – programming (1996–1999, 2018)
Jennie Bellestar – vocals (1996–1997)
Ruth McArdle – vocals (1996–1997)
Lian Warmington – vocals (1996–1997)
James Reynolds – engineering (1996–1997)
Ben Drakeford – engineering (1996–1997)
Jo Maskell – vocals (1997)
Andrew Bennett – guitars (1999)
Lisa Millet – vocals (1999)
Andy Cooke – programming (1999)
Arianne Schreiber – vocals (2001–2006)
Bryan Black – vocals, production, mixing (2001–2006)
Marc Heal – vocals, keyboards, programming (2004–2006, 2015–2019)
Dan Abela – guitars, engineering (2015–2016)
Nathan Cavaleri – guitars (2010, 2016)
Tim Skold – vocals, keyboards, guitars, programming, production (2018)
Anita Sylph – vocals (2018)
Joshua Broughton – guitars (2018)
Emre Ramazanoglu – keyboards, programming (2018)
Phil Barry – guitars (2018)
Ben Lee – violin (2018)
Sasha Grey – vocals (2018–2019)
Michelle Martinez – vocals (2018–2019)
Susannah Doyle – vocals (2018)

Discography (partial)
Several of his albums were originally released in Japan, where he enjoyed considerably more success than in the United States and United Kingdom, but some of those albums were eventually released in the US.

In 2004 he signed to Grand Recordings for distribution in the UK, under the name "Watts". The All Hamerican Pig Show was released in 2011 as a DVD via the Pig website, featuring performances from Pig's 2006 U.S. tour and a complete live performance from Osaka, Japan, 1999.  The DVD also included the music videos for Painiac and Everything.

Studio albums

 A Poke in the Eye... with a Sharp Stick (1988)
 Praise the Lard (1991)
 The Swining (1993) – Japan only release; reissued in 1999 in the US as The Swining/Red Raw & Sore
 Sinsation (1995) – US release in 1996
 Wrecked (1996) – Japanese release; US release in 1997 has somewhat different track listing
 Genuine American Monster (1999) – US release in 2002
 Pigmartyr (2004) – UK only release, using the "Watts" name
 Pigmata (2005) – remastered version of Pigmartyr, using the "PIG" name, with three additional tracks
 The Gospel (2016) – co-written and co-produced by Z. Marr
 Risen (2018)
 Candy (2019) – album of covers
 Pain Is God (2020)
 The Merciless Light (2022)

Remix albums
 Swine & Punishment (2017) – remixes of songs from The Gospel
 Stripped & Whipped (2019) – remixes of songs from Risen

EPs
 Hello Hooray
 A Stroll in the Pork (1992)
 Sin Sex & Salvation (as PIG vs KMFDM) (1994) – collaborative EP with KMFDM
 Red Raw & Sore (1994) – Japan only release; reissued in 1999 in America on The Swining/Red Raw & Sore (1999)
 Painiac (1995) – Japan only release
 Prime Evil (1997) – Japan only release
 No One Gets Out of Her Alive (1998) – Japan only release
 Disrupt Degrade & Devastate (1999) – Japan only release
 Compound Eye Sessions (2015) – with Marc Heal
 Long in the Tooth (2015) – with Primitive Race
 The Diamond Sinners (2016) – digital only release
 The Redeemer (2016) – tour only release
 Prey & Obey (2017) – digital only release
 Second Coming (2017) – tour only release
 Hell to Pay... in the USA (2018) – tour only release
 That's the Way (I Like It) (2018) – with Sasha Grey
 Mobocracy (2019) – tour only release
 The Wages of Sin (2019) – digital only release
 Sex & Death (2020) – digital only release

Singles
 "Never For Fun" (1988)
 "Sick City" / "Shit for Brains" (1989)
 "Shit for Brains" – Germany-only release
 "The Fountain of Miracles" (1993)
 "Black Mass" (2018)
 "Seed of Evil" (2019) – with Black Needle Noise

Video releases
The All Hamerican Pig Show (2011)

Book releases
PIG - The Word of the Lard: The Scripture of Raymond Watts (2017) – book compiling all of Raymond Watts' lyrics to date

Music videos
Several music videos have been filmed, but most remain unreleased outside Japan. Most videos have surfaced online on YouTube in questionable quality. The video for Arbor Vitate is actually a re-cut version of the Schaft video of the same song.

"Shit for Brains" (1988)
"The Fountain of Miracles" (1993)
"The Seven Veils" (1993)
"Painiac" (1995)
"Everything" (1996)
"Arbor Vitate" (2004)
"Long in the Tooth" (2015)
"The Diamond Sinners" (2016)
"Found in Filth" (2016)
"Prey & Obey" (2017)
"The Chosen Few" (2018)
"The Revelation" (2018)
"That's The Way (I Like It)" (2018)
"Happy Xmas (War Is Over)" (2018)
"You've Lost That Lovin' Feelin'" (2019)
"Mobocracy" (2019)
"Sex & Death" (2020)
"Rock 'n' Roll Refugee" (2020)

References

External links

 
 
 

British industrial musicians
KMFDM members
Living people
Industrial rock musical groups
Metropolis Records artists
Musical quartets
Nothing Records artists
Schwein members
Wax Trax! Records artists
Year of birth missing (living people)

sv:P.I.G.